Suleman Hamid Suleman (born 20 October 1997) is an Ethiopian professional footballer who plays as a right-back for Ethiopian Premier League club Saint George and the Ethiopia national team.

Club career

Hamid began his career with Adama City.

International career
Hamid made his international debut with the Ethiopia national team in a 3–2 friendly loss to Zambia on 22 October 2020.

References

External links
 
 

1997 births
Living people
Sportspeople from Benishangul-Gumuz Region
Ethiopian footballers
Ethiopia international footballers
Ethiopian Premier League players
Association football fullbacks
Adama City F.C. players
2021 Africa Cup of Nations players
Hadiya Hossana F.C. players
2022 African Nations Championship players
Ethiopia A' international footballers